Club Deportivo Santa Úrsula is a Spanish football team based in Santa Ursula, in the autonomous community of the Canary Islands. Founded in 1975 it plays in Tercera División RFEF – Group 12, holding home games at Estadio Argelio Tabares, with a capacity of 2,000 seats.

History 
In the 2016-17 season the club finished 16th in the Tercera División, Group 12.

Season to season

6 seasons in Tercera División
1 season in Tercera División RFEF

References

External links
Official Twitter 
Futbolme team profile  

Football clubs in the Canary Islands
Sport in Tenerife
Association football clubs established in 1975
1975 establishments in Spain